Annabel Jones (born January 1972) is a Welsh television producer, best known for producing Black Mirror with Charlie Brooker. She is a co-writer of the 2018 book Inside Black Mirror, with Brooker and Jason Arnopp. Jones is co-founder of the production company Broke and Bones, alongside Brooker.

Early life 
Jones was born in January 1972 and grew up in Milford Haven, Wales. She began studying developmental economics at the London School of Economics in 1990. After graduating in 1994, she worked for television production companies in Soho, London.

Career 
Jones became an executive at the production company Endemol. She began working with Charlie Brooker at the production company Zeppotron, owned by the Endemol, on five series of Charlie Brooker's Screenwipe (2006–2008), the first two series of the science fiction anthology series Black Mirror (2011 and 2013) and the satirical police procedural A Touch of Cloth (2012–2014). Jones and Brooker founded the Endemol Shine production company House of Tomorrow in 2014, Jones serving as managing director. It had a revenue of £31.2 million in 2018. Jones and Brooker quit the label House of Tomorrow in January 2020, founding the production company Broke and Bones in February 2020. The pair each have a 50% share in the company.

Filmography

Awards and nominations 
In 2017, Jones won a Primetime Emmy Award for the Black Mirror episode "San Junipero" and in 2018, won another for the episode "USS Callister". Alongside other individuals associated with the series, Jones was credited in the programme's nomination for the 2018 Black Reel Award for Outstanding Television Movie or Limited Series and the 2017 nomination and 2018 awarding of the Producers Guild of America Award for Best Long-Form Television.

Awards

Nominations

Personal life 
Jones is a vegetarian.

References

External links
 

Living people
1972 births
People from Milford Haven
Alumni of the London School of Economics
British television writers
Primetime Emmy Award winners
Showrunners
British women television writers
Black Mirror